The 36th New York Infantry Regiment was a New York Civil War regiment. It was a unique fighting force, including both Irishmen and New York Britons, having absorbed the New York British Volunteers while organizing. A colorful group known for its antics and in-fighting, it nevertheless made important contributions to the Union cause at such battles as Seven Pines, Malvern Hill, Fredericksburg, and Chancellorsville.  Many of its members were also present during the New York Draft Riots.

The unit served from 1861 to 1863.  It served closely with the 7th and 10th Massachusetts regiments, along with the 2nd Rhode Island.

It was first blooded at the battle of Seven Pines and later participated in the Union victory at Malvern Hill.  It was part of a detachment guarding the bridges at Fredericksburg and did not see combat there.  In the battle of Chancellorsville, it participated in the capture of Marye's Heights.

Before the Gettysburg battle, the two-year enlistment period of its members expired, though many were rushed to New York to quell the draft riots and the regiment suffered its last war casualties there.

See also
List of New York Civil War regiments

External links
 36th New York Volunteer Infantry, a site designed and researched by descendants of soldiers serving in this regiment, contains an unofficial history
New York State Military Museum and Veterans Research Center - Civil War - 36th Infantry Regiment History, photographs, table of battles and casualties, historical sketch, and newspaper clippings for the 36th New York Infantry Regiment.

Infantry 036
1861 establishments in New York (state)
Military units and formations established in 1861
Military units and formations disestablished in 1865